is a metaseries of science fiction anime OVAs by the studios Artmic and AIC, with production by Youmex. The original character designs were by Kenichi Sonoda, though these were dropped for the Gall Force: The Revolution remake. Central Park Media has licensed most of the films and OVAs with the exceptions of Ten Little Gall Force, Scramble Wars, and The Revolution.

Origin

Star Front Gall Force
This was the origin and precursor to the Gall Force franchise. Originally appearing in the monthly Model Graphix magazine in Japan as a 3D photo novel using detailed models, this later set the stage for the animated films. Rabby, Patty, and Rumy were the only main Solnoid characters featured, and they were equipped with different uniforms, weapons, and vehicles than those shown in the regular Gall Force OVAs. Although it was the first-ever storyline to the Gall Force mythos proper, Star Front's place in the official continuity has been questioned and disregarded due to contradictions between it and Eternal Story. Although it is the actual origin of the franchise, it is now seen by fans as non-canon, or an alternate timeline. Another factor that causes question is the fact that fans outside Japan never knew of the photo novel's existence.

Mainstream series
The original timeline for the Gall Force series consist of four story arcs: First Story Arc, Rhea Arc, Earth Chapter Arc and New Era Arc. Within each arc there are several episodes, with the exception of Rhea.

Original trilogy
The first arc starts with the centuries-long war between the Paranoids and the Solnoids, the exodus of early humanity to planet Terra, and the death of the Star Leaf crew. The timeline ends with events that will lead to the Rhea Arc. The first story arc consists of three episodes;

Gall Force: Eternal Story

Two advanced civilizations, the amoeba-like Paranoids and the all-female Solnoids, are waging a war that has gone on for many centuries. When the Solnoid fleet leaves a battle to defend an experimentally terraformed world from the Paranoids, one damaged Solnoid ship is separated from the fleet. This ship is a Kularis-class cruiser named the Star Leaf. Aboard the ship are only seven women: Eluza; the Highest ranking officer on board, Second-in-command Rabby, Pilot Lufy, Officers Catty, Pony, & Patty, and Ensign Rumy. After narrowly escaping a battle, the Star Leaf crew decides to continue with their orders and rendezvous at planet Chaos to defend it. However, their ship is the subject of an experiment, a plan which was secretly hatched by the leaders of both races which came into fruition during the battle, and the unsuspecting crew of seven Solnoid soldiers aboard the ship is caught up in the middle. The Star Leaf crew must now defend the artificial paradise of Chaos from the Paranoid fleet and foil the plans of the Solnoid leaders.

Gall Force 2: Destruction

Ten years later, one of the two survivors of the Star Leaf, Lufy, is recovered from space by Solnoid forces. There, she is confronted with the secret plan which had become reality in the previous episode: to genetically unite both races, codenamed the "Species Unification Plan". Wracked by self-doubt, Lufy is forced to make a decision as Solnoids and Paranoids face each other in battle in the very solar system in which the new life form and the last Star Leaf survivor have established an existence—and the Solnoid army, who are unaware of the plan, intend to deploy a System Destroyer to wipe out the enemy once and for all.

Gall Force 3: Stardust War

The destruction of the new future for Terra is averted, but Lufy and her friends find themselves in another twist: in a desolate solar system named Sigma Narse, the Solnoids and Paranoids intend to finish the war by fighting to the last by using their Planet Destroyers—which will result in the destruction of both sides, leaving them nothing but stardust in its wake (hence the title "Stardust War"). An encounter with the Solnoid instigator of the secret plan convinces the crew to try and walk a different path: To attempt to convince both sides to stop the senseless fighting by reminding them what they have already lost...

Rhea Arc

Rhea Gall Force takes place in the aftermath of the Stardust War, but before the events of Earth Chapter. In the 21st century the Earthen discovery of derelict alien technology on the Moon—which are in fact the remnants of the events in Eternal Story—ignited an arms race as the "Western" and "Eastern" blocs rushed to deploy the technology as weapons, including a form of artificial life based on the Paranoids, the MME. This artificial life turned on humanity, starting a war of extermination against their creators.

Rhea Plot Summary

In the year 2084, scientist Grey Newman found and reverse-engineered the technology from a Solnoid ship found on the Moon (see Eternal Story) and unintentionally brought about the end of civilization. World War III breaks out and in the middle of battle, the human's own alien synthezoids turn against their creators, nearly annihilating humankind.

Later in the year 2085, the remaining humans are on the run from the machines who are terminating them. In order to survive to defeat the alien machines, the human race must leave Earth, and go to Mars. Among these voyagers is one woman who bears the burden of guilt for her father's contribution to the destruction of civilization.

Earth Chapter Arc
The Earth Chapter Arc continues the story from Rhea Arc with reincarnations of the Star Leaf crew. After the completion of Operation Exodus, the earth resistance must survive long enough for the arrival of the Mars reinforcements led by General McKenzie. It consists of three episodes.

Earth Chapter 1

In the year 2085, the Earth is now a wasteland ruled by war machines that won an apocalyptic war. Shortly after that battle, mankind left and began new life on Mars. However, Sandy Newman and her comrades are left on Earth. While struggling to survive, the group locates an abandoned nuclear missile launch site. There they must contend with a quasi-religious group called Geo Chris which plans to make the Earth green once more. However to defeat the war machines of the enemy known as the MME, the earth resistance must use the nuclear missiles to attack the MME's citadel, but doing so would carry a heavy price.

Earth Chapter 2

On Mars, the viability of the final stages of Operation Exodus is debated, with the Martian military preferring a plan to use a Plasma cannon based on ancient Solnoid technology to destroy the MME citadel and end the war in one strike. The displaced earth resistance members of Operation Exodus and their allies in the Mars military disobey orders and take a ship to earth. On earth, GORN, the leader of the MME, captures Sandy Newman in order to obtain access to Earth's orbital weapons, which it plans to use to prevent the Martian assault. Sandy Newman and GORN must work together to prevent the Mars forces from destroying the earth's chance of survival.

Earth Chapter 3
The crew of the Martian vessels sent to Earth in Chapter 2 fight alongside the earth resistance in the final battles of the war with the MME. The main Mars forces have finally arrived as well, and their combined forces finally allow an assault on the MME's Citadel. The war will soon come to an end as Sandy comes face-to-face with GORN, but in doing so the truth behind the entire conflict is revealed.

New Era Arc
New Era concludes the story from Earth Chapter, but takes place about 200 years later. It consists of two episodes.

New Era Plot Summary

After centuries of war between humans and the MME machines, the humans have won the battle. However, many lives were lost and the Earth was rendered terribly damaged and unstable to live on. Shortly afterwards, mankind began to restore Earth, and a new race of cyborgs called "Yumans" had begun to live with the humans. In desire for a better future, humanity is now linked in one large computer network. However, a conflict between the Humans and Yumans shortly began. Considering themselves far better than the human, the Yumans began to plot a takeover. Now humanity lives separated into tightly packed arcologies built around the world, each keeping minimal contact with the other and dealing with internal problems like overpopulation.

A young scientist named Nova, influenced by revolutionary leader of the Yumans, Genova, develops his own plans to bring humanity down. Using the tools he's acquired over the years, he awakens artificial intelligence to destroy all human life, by reprograming every computer on Earth with the GORN virus. The virus is actually a bit more than Nova predicted, due to its intent on wiping out both humans and Yumans from the solar system. With the entire system now connected once more after all the wars, GORN is able to bring his presence everywhere in his attempt to achieve his long-term goals.

GORN's plans are not a surprise to Catty, for she has foreseen the disaster and sets her own plan into motion just before the virus strikes. Being a Yuman with heart, she leads a force of seven women into the final battle between man and machine!

Alternate series and releases

Gall Force: The Revolution
This 1996 OVA was a reimagining of the series, which replaced the amorphous Paranoids with a seemingly endless civil war between the "West Force" and "East Force" Solnoid armies. Unlike the previous OVAs' more somber and apocalyptic tones, The Revolution is a more traditional sci-fi adventure story, although it still stresses on the tragedies and wide-scale destruction caused by war. Four episodes were produced, along with one soundtrack album and a "vocal collection" starring the main female cast singing various songs, one of which being a "remake" of Disguised Spies from one of the original saga's soundtracks.

The plot tells of the struggle between the West Force and East Force armies of the Solnoids, which threatens to escalate into total destruction of the Solnoid race as both sides search for the ultimate war weapon, the anti-matter gun. By happenstance, however, several troopers from the East Force (Eluza, Rabby, Patty, and Rumy) and the West Force (Lufy) encounter the Conch, an outlawed Solnoid anti-war organization which is trying to spread peace among the hostile parties. As they discover that the war is merely used as an insidious instrument of balance by one singular Solnoid party, the rogue Solnoid troopers unwittingly find themselves fighting for an idea completely alien to them, but which presents the only way of stopping this perpetuated madness.

Ten Little Gall Force & Scramble Wars
The 1988 omake  was an animated mockumentary detailing a behind-the-scenes look at the production of Gall Force: Eternal Story and Destruction from the First Story Arc. Characters were drawn as super deformed versions of their Eternal Story counterparts. This video maintained a comedic tone as opposed to the somewhat serious war story in the original video it was supposedly documenting.

 (released 1992) is a humorous Japanese take on Wacky Races in which characters from several major series produced by Artmic—Bubblegum Crisis, Gall Force, Genesis Survivor Gaiarth, among others—compete for a trillion dollar-heavy trophy sponsored by the megacorporation Genom. The amount of this prize brings out the worst of many of the main characters, and even weapons of mass destruction are brought to bear against the competition.

Ten Little Gall Force was released along with Scramble Wars in the United States by AnimEigo on a single VHS video titled Super-Deformed Double Feature. Strangely, as of this time, these have not been released on DVD as with the other Gall Force titles and are (in their VHS release) much-sought rare collector's items.

Characters

Video games
A shoot 'em up was released in Japan, simply titled Gall Force, for the Family Computer Disk System by HAL Laboratory on November 19, 1986. Another shoot-em-up, also developed by Hal, was released during the same year titled Gall Force: Defense of Chaos for the MSX, which was followed by Gall Force: Eternal Story, a graphic adventure game for the MSX2, in 1987.

Music
Similarly to other OVAs of the era (and by studios AIC and ARTMIC), Gall Force features a huge amount of music, performed by the voice actors involved in the series. Several soundtracks were released for each film and OVA (and for each OVA episode in Earth Chapter's case). In addition, many music collections were released, featuring original songs performed by the aforementioned voice actors, along with various singles and a CD drama. So far, no soundtracks have been released for the films Destruction and Stardust War.

Soundtracks
Gall Force Eternal Story Original Animation Soundtrack
Rhea Gall Force Original Soundtrack
Gall Force Earth Chapter 1 Original Soundtrack
Gall Force Earth Chapter 2 Original Soundtrack
Gall Force Earth Chapter 3 Original Soundtrack
Gall Force New Era Original Soundtrack
Gall Force The Revolution Original Soundtrack

Singles
Good Feeling
Heiki ga Sore Yurusanai
Stardust Memory
Dream Again
NEVER END ~Don't Say Goodbye~
GALL FORCE - Sugao no Spy-tachi

Music Collections
Gall Force Eternal Band
Gall Force Earth Saga - Lady's Song of Gall Force
Gall Force Memorial Songs
Gall Force The Revolution Vocal Album

Gall Force Earth Saga - Back to the School Wars
A CD drama released during the Earth Saga OVAs' runtime, Back to the School Wars features alternate versions of the characters of the Rhea/Earth Chapter arc, placed in a high school setting while retaining most of their personality and abilities.

Notes

References

External links
Gall Force Famicom game strategy guide at Strategy Wiki
AIC's official Gall Force homepage
Gall Force Eternal
Gall Force at Gears Online
The Gall Force HomePage
Akon Kaguya: A Gall Force Site

Hal Lab's Official Site with Gall Force Game 
Gall Force NES Game

 
1986 anime films
1986 video games
1987 anime films
1988 anime films
1988 anime OVAs
1989 anime films
1989 anime OVAs
1991 anime OVAs
1996 anime OVAs
Adventure anime and manga
Anime International Company
Artland (company)
Central Park Media
HAL Laboratory games
Famicom Disk System games
Famicom Disk System-only games
MSX games
MSX-only games
MSX2 games
MSX2-only games
NEC PC-8801 games
Scrolling shooters
Video games developed in Japan
Video games featuring female protagonists
Cyberpunk anime and manga